Anagapetus is a genus of little black caddisflies in the family Glossosomatidae. There are about seven described species in Anagapetus.

Species
These seven species belong to the genus Anagapetus:
 Anagapetus aisha Denning, 1964
 Anagapetus bernea Ross, 1947
 Anagapetus chandleri Ross, 1951
 Anagapetus debilis (Ross, 1938)
 Anagapetus hoodi Ross, 1951
 Anagapetus schmidi (Levanidova, 1979)
 Anagapetus thirza Denning, 1965

References

Further reading

 
 
 

Glossosomatidae
Articles created by Qbugbot